Boyoubetterunow is a compilation by Swedish pop band The Concretes as well as their first major release. The album consists of the band's first two EPs, Limited Edition and Lipstick Edition, both previously released in 1999. It is currently out of print.

Track listing 
All music by The Concretes and lyrics by Victoria Bergsman.
 "Teen Love" – 3:24
 "Sunsets" – 3:09
 "Be Mine" – 4:04
 "Other Ones" – 3:48
 "Vacation" – 2:02
 "Recover" – 5:15
 "Give A Little" – 3:55
 "The Jeremiad" – 3:31
 "Cabaret" – 3:18
 "Tjyven (The Thief)" – 1:40
 "Contamination" – 2:54

 Tracks 3, 4, 7, 8 and 11 are from Limited Edition. All other tracks are from Lipstick Edition.

Personnel 

 Erik Bünger – String Arrangements
 The Concretes – Producer, Design
 Christopher Roth – Producer, Engin

References 

The Concretes albums
2000 compilation albums